Eastern London Cemetery is a new cemetery in the East of London opening in 2018.

The new cemetery will provide around 20,000 new burial plots for London, which has long been facing a critical shortage of burial space.

Location
The cemetery is in Rainham (London Borough of Havering) within the M25 motorway and is approximately 14 miles East of St Paul's Cathedral.

References

External links
 
 

Cemeteries in London
2016 establishments in England